California's 3rd district may refer to:

 California's 3rd congressional district
 California's 3rd State Assembly district
 California's 3rd State Senate district